Andrey Removich Belousov (born 17 March 1959) is a Russian economist and politician, serving as First Deputy Prime Minister since 21 January 2020. Previously, he was an Assistant to the President of Russia and Minister of Economic Development. 

Belousov briefly served as Acting Prime Minister of Russia in April and May 2020, after Mikhail Mishustin contracted COVID-19.

Early life and education
Belousov was born in Moscow on 17 March 1959. He studied economics at Moscow State University and graduated with honors in 1981.

Career
From 1981 to 1986, Belousov was probationer-researcher and then junior researcher in the simulation laboratory of human-machine systems of the Central Economic Mathematical Institute. From 1991 to 2006, he was head of laboratory in the Institute of Economic Forecasting in the Russian Academy of Science. He was external advisor to prime minister from 2000 to 2006. Then he served as deputy minister of economic development and trade for two years from 2006 to 2008.

From 2008 to 2012, he was director of the finances and economic department in the Russian Prime Minister's office.

On 21 May 2012, he was appointed minister of economic development to the cabinet led by prime minister Dimitri Medvedev. Belousov succeeded Elvira Nabiullina as minister of economic development.

On 24 June 2013, he was appointed as Presidential Assistant in Economic Affairs.

On 21 January 2020, Belousov was appointed as First Deputy Prime Minister of Russia in the Mikhail Mishustin's Cabinet.
From 30 April to 19 May 2020, Belousov was appointed by Vladimir Putin as Acting Prime Minister of Russia, temporarily replacing Mikhail Mishustin, after the latter was diagnosed with coronavirus.  According to Politico, he is one possible successor to President Vladimir Putin.

In 2022, the European Union imposed sanctions on Andrey Belousov in relation to the 2022 Russian invasion of Ukraine, followed by the United States, Japan, and New Zealand.

References

1959 births
Living people
1st class Active State Councillors of the Russian Federation
Moscow State University alumni
21st-century Russian politicians
Economy ministers of Russia
Economists from Moscow
Deputy heads of government of the Russian Federation
Independent politicians in Russia
Politicians from Moscow
Acting prime ministers of the Russian Federation
Russian individuals subject to European Union sanctions